Numbers is an American television series produced by brothers Ridley and Tony Scott. It premiered on CBS on Sunday, January 23, 2005 at 10:00 pm with its pilot episode then moved to its Friday slot five days later. It remained in that slot for the rest of its run. The series is set in Los Angeles, California, and follows the stories of a Federal Bureau of Investigation (FBI) team and a mathematics professor, focusing on relationships between FBI Special Agent in Charge Don Eppes (Rob Morrow), his brother Professor Charlie Eppes (David Krumholtz) and their father, Alan Eppes (Judd Hirsch), and on the brothers' efforts to fight crime. A typical episode begins with a crime, which is subsequently investigated by Don's team and mathematically described by Charlie. The insights provided by Charlie's mathematics are almost always crucial to solving the crime.

In total, six complete seasons consisting of 118 episodes were broadcast. The first season, a mid-season replacement for Dr. Vegas, was the shortest of the six, and spanned 13 episodes from January to May 2005. Seasons two and three aired from September to May of the 2005–2006 and 2006–2007 seasons respectively, but season four was cut short by the 2007–2008 Writers Guild of America strike. Twelve episodes were originally produced and aired from September 2007 to January 2008. Six more episodes were aired in April and May 2008 after the strike ended. Season 5 began airing on October 3, 2008 and continued through to May 2009. Season six began in late September 2009 and concluded in March 2010.

In addition to being broadcast on television, Numbers is available on DVD. All seasons have been released encoded for Region 1 and Region 2, and seasons one, two, three, four, and five have been released encoded for Region 4. Individual episodes of Numbers can also be purchased by registered members of the US iTunes Store and as video on demand from Netflix and Amazon Unbox, now Amazon Prime. CBS also streams the episodes on its website.

Series overview

Episodes

Season 1 (2005)

Season 2 (2005–06)

Season 3 (2006–07)

Season 4 (2007–08)

Season 5 (2008–09)

Season 6 (2009–10)

References
General

Specific
NOTE: Refs Need Archive Backup URLs @ https://archive.org/web/

External links

Mathematical description of Numbers

Lists of American crime drama television series episodes